Ana Sofía Gómez Porras (born 24 November 1995) is a Guatemalan artistic gymnast.

Senior career
Gómez won the silver medal in the all-around event and the gold medal in balance beam for Gymnastics at the 2011 Pan American Games. She competed for Guatemala at the 2012 Summer Olympics. In the individual women's all-around at the 2012 London Olympics, she qualified into the event in 16th, eventually going on to finish 22nd. In 2013, she competed in the World Cup in Ljubljana, Slovenia, and she placed fourth on the floor final with a score of 13.125.

In 2014, she went to Texas to improve her skills before she went to compete in Croatia. Although she qualified into the balance beam final in first place with a score of 13.900, in the final she fell and received a 7.300 in execution and a 6.100 in difficulty, a total of 13.400, finishing in fourth place.
In July, she traveled to Canada one month before the Pan American Championships. On 30 August, she competed in the all-around and finished in 7th place with a final score of 54.100, and qualified for the balance beam finals with a score of 14.050. She had the highest D score of 6.300, and in her final exercise she got 14.450, 8.250 in execution and 6.200 in difficulty.
In October she participated in the 2014 World Artistic Gymnastics Championships held in Nanning, China, and she placed 43rd in the all-around qualification, yet she had some mistakes, and she lost some points on balance beam.

In 2015, she trained in Canada almost two months before the Pan American Games. She started on uneven bars, receiving a score of 14.250, 14.350 on balance beam, 14.000 on floor, and 14.600 on vault, so she qualified in third in the all around final. However, in the final she fell on the uneven bars and did not medal, but she qualified to 3 apparatus finals – uneven bars in 6th place, balance beam in 3rd and floor in 6th. In the final she fell off the balance beam and finished in 7th place. On floor, she had perfect lines, earning herself a bronze medal with 14.150.

She competed for Guatemala at the 2016 Summer Olympics. However, she did not qualify for any of the event finals or the women's individual all-around final. She was the flagbearer for Guatemala during the Parade of Nations.

References

External links
 

1995 births
Living people
Sportspeople from Guatemala City
Guatemalan female artistic gymnasts
Gymnasts at the 2010 Summer Youth Olympics
Gymnasts at the 2012 Summer Olympics
Gymnasts at the 2016 Summer Olympics
Olympic gymnasts of Guatemala
Gymnasts at the 2011 Pan American Games
Gymnasts at the 2015 Pan American Games
Pan American Games gold medalists for Guatemala
Pan American Games silver medalists for Guatemala
Pan American Games bronze medalists for Guatemala
Pan American Games medalists in gymnastics
Central American and Caribbean Games silver medalists for Guatemala
Competitors at the 2014 Central American and Caribbean Games
Central American and Caribbean Games medalists in gymnastics
Medalists at the 2015 Pan American Games
Medalists at the 2011 Pan American Games
21st-century Guatemalan women